Veterans on Patrol is an American right-wing extremist militia founded by Michael “Lewis Arthur” Meyer.

History and aims 
Veterans on Patrol was founded in Pima County, Arizona in 2015 with the initial aim of supporting military veterans. Since 2018, the activities of the organisation shifted away from its initially stated goals and towards anti-human trafficking activities on the Mexico–United States border.

Philosophies of the organisation include nativism, Christian nationalism, and anti-government values. Views shared by the group include antisemitic, anti-Mormon, anti-Catholic, anti-indigenous misinformation. Members embrace QAnon conspiracy theories and vigilante activities. In 2018, the group labelled a homeless encampment as a child sex-trafficking location. 

The group has over 70,000 followers of its Facebook page.

References 

Militia in the United States
2015 establishments in Arizona
Organizations based in Arizona
American Christian political organizations